Jaime Ruiz Llaneza (born 1 April 1975, in Culiacán, Sinaloa) is a Mexican former footballer, who played as attacking midfielder with Monarcas Morelia in Primera División de México. Ruiz made his debut on 19 August 1999 in a 2–1 loss against with two own goals Pachuca.

External links
 

Sportspeople from Culiacán
Cruz Azul footballers
Irapuato F.C. footballers
Dorados de Sinaloa footballers
C.D. Veracruz footballers
Club Necaxa footballers
Atlético Morelia players
Liga MX players
Footballers from Sinaloa
Mexican footballers
Association football midfielders
1975 births
Living people